Parbhani Lok Sabha constituency is one of the 48 Lok Sabha (Parliamentary) constituencies in Maharashtra state in western India. This constituency covers the entire Parbhani district and a part of Jalna district.

Vidhan Sabha segments
At present, Parbhani (परभणी) Lok Sabha constituency comprises six Vidhan Sabha (legislative assembly) segments. These segments are:

Members of Parliament

Election results

Lok Sabha elections 2019

General Elections 2014

General elections 2009

Lok Sabha elections 1952
 Narayan Waghmare (Peasant and Worker's Party) : 92,698 votes 
 Ramchandra Nandapurkar (Congress) : 47,736

See also
 Parbhani district
 Jalna district
 List of Constituencies of the Lok Sabha

References

External links
Parbhani lok sabha  constituency election 2019 results details

Lok Sabha constituencies in Maharashtra
Parbhani district
Politics of Jalna district
1957 establishments in Bombay State